Matthew Libatique (born July 19, 1968) is an American cinematographer. He is best known for his work with director Darren Aronofsky on the films Pi (1998), Requiem for a Dream (2000), The Fountain (2006), Black Swan (2010), Noah (2014), and Mother! (2017). For his work on Black Swan and Bradley Cooper's directorial debut film, A Star Is Born (2018), Libatique was nominated for the Academy Award for Best Cinematography.

Early life and education
Matthew Libatique was born in Elmhurst, Queens, New York City, to Filipino immigrant parents Georgina (née José) and Justiniáno Libatique. His father was from Dagupan and his mother is from Lucena.

Libatique studied sociology and communications at California State University, Fullerton before earning an MFA in cinematography at AFI Conservatory.

Career
Libatique served as director of photography for music videos and teamed with fellow AFI alumnus Aronofsky for the short film Protozoa. The two collaborated on the first three of Aronofsky's feature films. Other frequent collaborators are Julie Dash (music videos including Tracy Chapman's "Give Me One Reason"), Spike Lee (She Hate Me, Inside Man and Miracle at St. Anna), Joel Schumacher (Tigerland, Phone Booth and The Number 23), and Jon Favreau (Iron Man, Iron Man 2 and Cowboys & Aliens).

Libatique's notable films include blockbusters such as Iron Man and Iron Man 2. In 2010, he was nominated for an Academy Award for Best Cinematography for his work on Black Swan, for which he won his second Independent Spirit award. He has also won best cinematography awards at the LA Film Critics Association, NY Film Critics Online, SF Film Critics, among many others.

Libatique discussed the importance of working closely with a director on a Cinematographer Roundtable with The Hollywood Reporter, revealing: “The main thing is that you (both cinematographer and director) have the same goal and are telling the same story. Going into preparation you really need to be on the same page. Conflicts may arise when there’s a miscommunication about what’s important in a scene. So, it’s really important to listen...The director can (understandably) get pulled in a lot of different directions in prep. We, cinematographers are sort of guarding the gate of filmmaking, amongst all the other things that are happening.”

In addition to guarding the filmmaking gate, he also says of his process: “I’d like to think each film is custom made. The director obviously dictates the approach that I have because everybody has a different working style. Some people want to talk intensely and visually about shots. Some don’t talk much at all. They concentrate more on the performances and they give you a broad idea of what they want the film to look like. So my first approach is to evaluate them, which may start in the interview process. But you also learn in preparation, as much as you can about the director. And that informs how I prepare in pre-production. If I’m lucky I can shape a visual language off some kind of inspiration. But the director definitely dictates how I do it.”

2018 arrest
In November 14, 2018, Libatique was arrested on suspicion of assault for allegedly attacking paramedics and police at a hotel in Bydgoszcz, Poland. Libatique was attending Camerimage at the time. He was released without a fine or charges. In November 2020, a trial for Libatique was set to begin in February 2021. Libatique admitted to drinking but claimed to have been unknowingly drugged, with no memory of the alleged encounter.

Filmography

Films

Music videos

References

External links

Internet Encyclopedia of Cinematographers

Living people
1968 births
AFI Conservatory alumni
American cinematographers
American people of Ilocano descent
American Society of Cinematographers
California State University, Fullerton alumni
Independent Spirit Award winners
People from Elmhurst, Queens